National Common Mobility Card (NCMC) is an inter-operable transport card conceived by the Ministry of Housing and Urban Affairs of the Government of India. It was launched on 4 March 2019. The transport card enables the user to pay for travel, toll duties (toll tax), retail shopping and withdraw money.

It is enabled through the RuPay card mechanism. The NCMC card is issuable as a prepaid, debit, or credit RuPay card from partnered banks such as the State Bank of India, Bank of India, Punjab National Bank, and others.

History 
In late 2010, the Government of India envisioned a scheme wherein seamless access could be granted to public transport networks. The system, which later came to be known as Integrated Financial Management System (IFMS), aimed to let passengers to pay across different public transport platforms using one system. This was created as an effort to bring together the public transport system of the country under one umbrella. By making it accessible to every individual in every city, the government aimed to increase ease of access for public transport. The project is also structured in such a way so as to include customers across a wide variety of socio-economic strata. An additional focus was also put on reducing the transaction time to the minimum, so as to make the payment experience as seamless as possible. It is also structured in such a way so as to reduce the financial risk to the stakeholders involved in the effort. It is designated as an EMV-based Open Loop Payments system.

The NCMC is an indigenously made product, and is a part of the Make In India project. It was first conceptualised in 2006 as part of the National Urban Transport Policy (NUTP). A previous attempt to develop a similar national mobility card led to the development of the More Card. Given its lack of seamless functioning across the nation, Venkaiah Naidu, the then Minister of Urban Development, set up a committee to recommend a card which is inter-operable across different transport systems in the country.

The urban development ministry brought in the National Payments Corporation of India (NPCI) with the task of management, clearing and settlement of payments, simulating cards and terminals and maintenance of network. Bharat Electronics Limited (BEL) has created the reader prototype.

On 8 April 2019, The Economic Times reported that Visa was seeking to issue National Common Mobility Cards. Visa announced that it had launched specifications to support the NCMC on 13 May 2019. Visa is ready with the specifications to start issuing cards on the NCMC network and has started discussions with banks to issue their cards on NCMC as well, but it will take some time for the cards to start getting rolled out in the market. Mastercard stated on 22 May 2019 that 15 Indian banks were at "various stages of signing up" for its NCMC. Mastercard is all set to join the National Common Mobility Card (NCMC) scheme, just weeks after its biggest competitor Visa said it planned to enter the programme as per Vikas Varma, senior vice-president, account management for South Asia at Mastercard.

Mumbai Rail Vikas Corporation (MRVC) is planning to implement the ambitious scheme in Mumbai suburban railway network in a step towards integrated ticketing system (ITS).

Acceptance
The following public transport systems in the country currently accept fare payments via the National Common Mobility Card, with many more public transport operators across the country in various stages of planning/implementation to accept NCMC as a mode of payment over the next few years.

References

Contactless smart cards
Fare collection systems
Public transport in India
Debit cards
Credit cards in India
Modi administration initiatives
Ministry of Urban Development
2019 establishments in India